Marian Kegel (25 May 1945 – 19 September 1972) was a Polish cyclist. He competed in the individual road race and the team time trial events at the 1968 Summer Olympics.

References

External links
 

1945 births
1972 deaths
Polish male cyclists
Olympic cyclists of Poland
Cyclists at the 1968 Summer Olympics
Sportspeople from Poznań
20th-century Polish people